Zvi Bodie (born April 27, 1943) is an American economist, author and professor. He was the Norman and Adele Barron Professor of Management at Boston University, teaching finance at Questrom for 43 years before retiring in 2015. His textbook, Investments, (with Kane and Marcus) is the market leader and is used in the certification programs of the CFA Institute and the Society of Actuaries. Bodie's work has centered on pension finance and investment strategy. He continues to do consulting work and media interviews.

Education and background 
Bodie holds a Ph.D in economics (1975) from the Massachusetts Institute of Technology, a M.A. in Economics (1970) from the Hebrew University, and a B.A. with Honors in Philosophy (1965) from Brooklyn College. 
 
He has served on the finance faculty at the Harvard Business School and MIT Sloan School of Management. Bodie was on the editorial board of the Journal of Pension Economics and Finance, and served as an advisory member to the World Bank Project on Old Age Security. He was also a consultant to the State of Israel concerning reform of their pension system. 

In 2007 the Retirement Income Industry Association gave Bodie their Lifetime Achievement Award for applied research, and in 2019 he received the Plan Sponsor Council of America's Lifetime Achievement Award. He also won the Financial Analysts Journal Graham and Dodd Scroll in 1985 and 1996.

Investment philosophy 
Bodie, an expert on retirement and financial economics, is a long-time advocate of diversity and "safety-first investing." In 1995 he offered a warning about the risks of investing heavily in stocks, in a journal article: On the Risk of Stocks in the Long Run. 

In 2003, he spoke again, about investing too heavily in the stock market, saying "people who have been following conventional investment advice are probably taking more risk than they should and don't even know it. They've been told not to worry about the stock market going down because in the long-run, stocks are going to beat everything else. That's a fundamental fallacy."  

After the stock market crash of 2007--2008, in a 2009 interview, he advised:  

Bodie added "he follow[ed] his own advice and did not lose a penny in the recent market meltdown." 

Prior to, and during, the 2020 COVID-19 pandemic, he offered advice on how people can use the principles of risk management to protect their investments, and plan for unforeseen risks. Bodie prescribes a diversified portfolio that includes products with guaranteed returns such as government bonds and traditional retirement plans that assure a minimum interest rate.

His investment strategy consists of a five-step process to analyze and evaluate what kinds of risks one faces, and how to determine the best way to implement an investment plan. 

Bodies' five-step plan consists of Risk identification, Risk assessment, Selection of risk-management techniques, Implementation, and Review; the five steps are then followed by a four-step processof: 

 Diversifying: owning diversified risky assets to avoid undue risk.
 Hedging: taking less risk and giving up upside; an example is buying I savings bonds (inflation-linked bonds that protect investor purchasing power) to offset the risk of stocks.
 Insuring: paying someone else to pay you if something bad happens, while keeping the upside in good times; an example is a put option on the stock market, a contract that ensures you can sell stocks at a prespecified price.
 Saving for emergencies: keeping an emergency fund of liquid savings for the unexpected.

Bodie has promoted his system of investment and retirement planning in numerous interviews on PBS, CNN and other media outlets over the years.

Bibliography 
Bodie has authored and co-authored multiple books and textbooks, and his written works have focused on pension finance and investment strategy. Some of his work is listed below.

Books 
 The Foundations of Pension Finance, (with E.P. Davis), Edward Elgar Publishing, 2000.
 Pensions in the U.S. Economy, (with John B. Shoven and David A. Wise), University of Chicago Press, 1988.
 Issues in Pension Economics, (with John B. Shoven and David A. Wise), University of Chicago Press, 1987.
 Financial Aspects of the U.S. Pension System, (with John B. Shoven, 3rd edition, 2010.

Textbooks 
 Essentials of Investments, (with Alex Kane and Alan Marcus), McGraw-Hill/Irwind, 11th edition, 2019.

Investments, (with Alex Kane and Alan Marcus), McGraw-Hill, 11th edition, 2012.
 
Risk Less and Prosper: Your Guide to Safer Investing, (with Rachelle Taqqu), Jon Wiley & Sons, 2011.
The Future of Life Cycle Savings and Investing, (with Dennis McLeavy and Laurence B. Siegel), Research Foundation of CFA Institute, 2009.
Financial Economics, (with Robert Merton and David Cleeton), Prentice Hall, 2nd edition, 2008.
Worry-Free Investing: A Safe Approach to Achieving Your Lifetime Goals, (with Michael J. Clowes), Financial Times/Prentice Hall, 1st edition, 2003.

Journal articles 

 "Do a firm's equity returns reflect the risk of its pension plan?,"  Journal of Financial Economics, Volume 81, Issue 1, with Li Jin, 2006.

 "Personal Investing: Advice, Theory, and Evidence,"  Financial Analysts Journal, Volume 53, Issue 6, with Dwight B. Crane, 1997.

 "On the Risk of Stocks in the Long Run," Financial Analysts Journal, Volume 51, Issue 3, 1995.

 "Risk and Return in Commodity Futures,"  Financial Analysts Journal, Volume 36, Issue 3, with Victor I. Rosansky, 1980.
 "Common Stocks as a Hedge Against Inflation," The Journal of Finance, Volume 31, Issue 2, 1976.

References

External links
zvibodie.com
SSRN Author page

Harvard Business School faculty
Massachusetts Institute of Technology School of Science alumni
Boston University faculty
Living people
Corporate finance theorists
Financial economists
MIT Sloan School of Management faculty
21st-century American economists
1943 births
American financial writers
Brooklyn College alumni
American expatriates in Israel